Madhuca glabrescens is a plant in the family Sapotaceae. The specific epithet glabrescens means "becoming glabrous", referring to the leaves.

Description
The bark is reddish brown. Inflorescences bear up to six flowers.

Distribution and habitat
Madhuca glabrescens is endemic to Borneo. Its habitat is lowland mixed dipterocarp forest, to  altitude.

Conservation
Madhuca glabrescens has been assessed as vulnerable on the IUCN Red List. The species is threatened by logging and conversion of land for palm oil plantations.

References

glabrescens
Endemic flora of Borneo
Trees of Borneo
Plants described in 1925